Antonio del Ceraiolo, also known as Antonio di Arcangelo (the nickname "Ceraiolo" derives from the profession of his father, a ceraiolo, or candle maker), was an Italian Renaissance painter active in his native Florence between 1518 and 1538. According to Giorgio Vasari, Ceraiolo was a pupil first of Lorenzo di Credi and then of Ridolfo Ghirlandaio, in whose biography he is mentioned. Vasari singled out Ceraiolo's abilities as a portraitist and mentioned two of his altarpieces, both of which survive at the Museo del Cenacolo di San Salvi, Florence. The first of these is a Crucifixion with Saints Francis and Mary Magdalen, originally in the church of San Jacopo tra' i fossi; the second a Saint Michael for the basilica of the Santissima Annunziata.

Most of Ceraiolo's paintings are half-length images of the Madonna and Child, usually with the young Saint John the Baptist, Florence's patron saint.

References

Tamborino, Alessandra. “Considerazioni sull’attività di Antonio del Ceraiolo e proposte al suo catalogo,” Proporzioni (2003): pp. 104–122.
Zeri, Federico. “Antonio del Ceraiolo,” Gazette des Beaux-Arts, LXX (1967): pp. 139–154.

Painters from Florence
Renaissance painters
16th-century Italian painters
Italian male painters